Dixie County School District, also known as Dixie District Schools, is a school district headquartered in Cross City, Florida. It serves Dixie County.

Schools
 Dixie County High School (Cross City)
 Ruth Rains Middle School (Cross City)
 Anderson Elementary School (Cross City)
 Old Town Elementary School (Old Town)

References

External links
 
School districts in Florida
Dixie County, Florida